Epiphyllum baueri is an epiphytic species of cactus native to Colombia and Panama. It is found up to 250 m in altitude in subtropical and tropical moist lowland forest. The assessment of the IUCN red list concludes, that this species status is data deficient.

References

External links

Night-blooming plants
baueri
Epiphytes